The South African type GT tender was a steam locomotive tender.

Type GT tenders entered service in 1929, as tenders to the   shunting steam locomotives which were placed in service by the South African Railways in that year.

Manufacturer
Type GT tenders were built in 1928 by Henschel and Son of Kassel in Germany.

The South African Railways (SAR) placed fourteen Class S shunting locomotives in service in 1929. The engines and tenders were built to the design of Col F.R. Collins DSO, Chief Mechanical Engineer of the SAR. They were initially placed in service in Natal and the Orange Free State, but were soon transferred to several centres around Transvaal. The Type GT entered service as tenders to these locomotives.

Characteristics
To improve the crew's rearward vision, the top sides of the tender's coal bunker were set inwards and the top of the water tank was rounded. An unusual characteristic for a tender was a frame which extended behind the water tank to form a platform, equipped with handrails for use by shunting crew.

Locomotive
Only the Class S locomotives were delivered new with Type GT tenders, which were numbered in the range from 360 to 373 for their engines. An oval number plate, bearing the engine number and tender type, was attached to the rear end of the tender.

Classification letters
Since many tender types are interchangeable between different locomotive classes and types, a tender classification system was adopted by the SAR. The first letter of the tender type indicates the classes of engines to which it can be coupled. The "G_" tenders could only be used with the Class S locomotives with which they were delivered.

The second letter indicates the tender's water capacity.

Illustration

References

GT